National Route 158 is a national highway of Japan connecting Fukui and Matsumoto, Nagano in Japan, with a total length of .

See also

References

158
Roads in Fukui Prefecture
Roads in Gifu Prefecture
Roads in Nagano Prefecture